Wilhelm Paul Ludwig, Prince of Löwenstein-Wertheim-Freudenberg (19 March 1817 – 10 March 1887) was a member of the princely house of Löwenstein-Wertheim-Freudenberg. He became the fourth Prince of Löwenstein-Wertheim-Freudenberg in 1861.

Early life  
Wilhelm was born on 19 March 1817 in Stuttgart, Germany, as the eldest son of Prince Wilhelm of Löwenstein-Wertheim-Freudenberg (1783–1847) and his wife, Dorothea Christine von Kahlden (1791–1860). Wilhelm received a humanistic education by private teachers, and he studied science at the University of Bonn. He also studied law, political economy, philosophy, and art history. His friend from this time of studies was Prince Albert of Saxe-Coburg and Gotha, who became the husband of Queen Victoria.

Career
In 1861, Wilhelm became the reigning prince of Löwenstein-Wertheim-Freudenberg upon the death of his predecessor, Prince Adolf of Löwenstein-Wertheim-Freudenberg.

Personal life 
Wilhelm married Countess Olga Clara von Schönburg-Glauchau (1831–1868) on 20 April 1852 in Pillnitz bei Dresden. She was a daughter of Karl Heinrich Alban Graf und Herr von Schönburg-Forderglauchau (1804–1864) and his wife, Countess Amalie von Jenison-Walworth (youngest daughter of Count Franz von Jenison-Walworth). Before the death of his first wife in 1868, they were the parents of nine children together: 

 Ernst Alban Ludwig, Prince of Löwenstein-Wertheim-Freudenberg (1854–1931), who married Wanda, Countess of Wylich and Lottum, youngest daughter of Wilhelm Malte II, in 1886.
 Alfred, Prince of Löwenstein-Wertheim-Freudenberg (1855–1925), who married Pauline, Countess of Reichenbach-Lessonitz, daughter of Wilhelm, Count of Reichenbach-Lessonitz (a younger son of William II, Elector of Hesse and Emilie Ortlöpp), in 1880.
 Vollrath, Prince of Löwenstein-Wertheim-Freudenberg (1856–1919)
 Karl, Prince of Löwenstein-Wertheim-Freudenberg (1858–1928)
 Friedrich Ernst Ludwig, Prince of Löwenstein-Wertheim-Freudenberg (1860–1920), who married Hedwig Aloysia Muller, daughter of Anton Muller, in 1890.
 Marie, Princess of Löwenstein-Wertheim-Freudenberg (1861–1941), who married Friedrich Count of Lippe-Biesterfeld in 1892.
 Wilhelm Gustav Ludwig, Prince of Löwenstein-Wertheim-Freudenberg (1863–1915), who married his cousin, Luise Baroness von Fabrice, daughter of Bernhard, Baron von Fabrice and Ida, Countess von Schönburg-Glauchau, in 1887.
 Ludwig, Prince of Löwenstein-Wertheim-Freudenberg (1864–1899), who married Lady Anne Savile, daughter of John Savile, 4th Earl of Mexborough, in 1897.
 Adele, Princess of Löwenstein-Wertheim-Freudenberg (1866–1890), who married Gustav Biron von Kirland in 1885.

After the death of his first wife, Wilhelm married again. His second wife was Bertha Hagen (1845–1895).

On 10 March 1887, Wilhelm died at the age of 69.

Honours and awards
 Knight of Honour of the Johanniter Order, 21 October 1847
 Knight of the Order of the Red Eagle, 1st Class, 5 October 1867
 Grand Cross of the Order of the Zähringer Lion, 1864

References

Bibliography 
 Franz Bosbach. Die Studien des Prinzen Albert an der Universität Bonn (1837–1838), Verlag: Saur K.G. Verlag Gmbh 2009, .
 Stanley Weintraub. Albert: Uncrowned King, London 1997, .

1817 births
1887 deaths
People from Main-Spessart
People from the Kingdom of Bavaria
House of Löwenstein-Wertheim-Freudenberg
Princes of Löwenstein-Wertheim-Freudenberg
Members of the Bavarian Reichsrat
German Roman Catholics